Albert Park is a large public park in the City of Port Phillip, an inner suburban LGA of Melbourne, Victoria, Australia.

The park is an important site for the sporting culture of Melbourne and Victoria, hosting multiple sports venues such as the Lakeside Stadium, the Melbourne Sports and Aquatic Centre and other indoor sports facilities, the Albert Park Yacht Club and Albert Sailing Club, the Albert Park Golf Course, a  walking track around the lake, numerous ovals, and the Albert Park Circuit motor racing track. It occupies a trapezoid superblock bordered by (clockwise from north) Albert Road, Queens Road, Fitzroy Street and Canterbury Road, and surrounding suburbs include Albert Park, Middle Park and St. Kilda West to the west and southwest; St Kilda to the south; South Yarra, Prahran and Windsor to the east; and South Melbourne to the north. The public-funded Mac.Robertson Girls' High School, one of Australia's top selective schools, is located to the northeastern corner of the park.

History

Early history
Albert Park was originally part of the extensive Yarra River Delta, which involved vast areas of wetlands and sparse vegetation, interspersed with lagoons, some of which were quite large, including the lagoon from which Albert Park Lake was created. The area was occupied by localised tribes of Indigenous Australians, the Boonwurrung people, for around 40,000+ years prior to European settlement, and was one of many sites around Melbourne where regular corroborees (meetings) were held.

19th and 20th centuries
Following British settlement from 1835 onwards, much of the Yarra River delta was drained to dry the land and enable agriculture, housing and grazing. Through the 1840s and 1850s, the area now occupied by Albert Park itself was unofficial parkland, used for military training, grazing and hunting. In 1864 the area was officially proclaimed a public park and named Albert Park in honour of Queen Victoria's consort, Prince Albert.

Through much of the late 19th century, allotments were allocated for sporting facilities such as football, tennis, bowling, cricket and boating. Between 1873 and 1880, silt in the lagoons was excavated and used as infill around the lagoon itself to create a permanent lake. In 1890, water was diverted from the Yarra River to help fill the lake. Through the late 19th and early 20th centuries, the park was used as a tip, a camp for the armed services, scenic drives, picnics, and many other forms of recreation.

In 1882, 1918 and 1935, adjoining educational institutions acquired land from the park, to much opposition at the time. From 1941 to 1950, the Army occupied large areas of land in the park:  this land was given back to the park during the 1950s and 1960s. From 1953 to 1958, motor racing was held within the park, including the 1953 and 1956 Australian Grands Prix, around the lake, until it was moved to the Phillip Island Grand Prix Circuit. Through much of the 1960s, 1970s, and 1980s, although by this time the park was home to over 100 sporting clubs, general park maintenance was neglected by an over-restrictive management and funding became hard to come by, finances of any significance only being collected from the two restaurants in the park.

Recent years
During the early 1990s, the lake was drained to remove weed infestations, rubbish and other debris that had accumulated over the years, and the park was reclassified as a sporting reserve. In 1996 the Australian Grand Prix moved from the Adelaide Street Circuit to a reconstructed Albert Park Circuit, loosely following the 1950s configuration. This was met with much opposition, but the project went ahead and a host of sporting facilities were subsequently constructed and funding allocated to improve the parklands followed.

Albert Park is enjoyed by approximately five million visitors annually. Vestiges of Albert Park's Aboriginal history still remain, the most noticeable being the large ancient river red gum tree, reputed to be the site of many corroborees. It is thought to be over 300 years old, the oldest remnant tree in the Port Phillip area, located next to Junction Oval on the corner of Fitzroy Street and Queens Road, St Kilda.

The Clarendon Street gates were originally built of wooden pickets in 1910, they were cast in wrought iron in 1939 and can still be seen today.

Habitat and fauna

The parkland, Albert Park Lake and Gunn Island provides a grassy wetland habitat for nearly two hundred bird species, both resident and transient. A 1990 study recorded 31 bird species as breeding in the park with a total of 21 these indigenous species.
Migratory species include the flame robin, white-throated needletail and sacred kingfisher.

A population of highly resident Black Swans (Cygnus atratus) are a popular feature of the lake. The swans breed on Gunn Island, away from predators that can attack the eggs on the mainland. In efforts to study this population of swans, The University of Melbourne has a long-standing project surveying these swans. Swans are periodically captured, measured, tagged, and released. The neck collars are not harmful to the birds and these swans can be identified from the shore by their black and white neck tags. Sightings of these swans at Albert Park Lake and across Victoria can be reported to myswan.org.au, a citizen-science project that enables users and researchers to track their movements across the state.

Locally rare native bird species that have been recorded in the park include little egret, laughing kookaburra, Australian shelduck, Cape Barren goose, great crested grebe, white-bellied sea eagle and whiskered tern, while little ravens, Australian magpies, long-billed corella, sulphur-crested cockatoo, willie wagtails and magpie-larks are common. Common lake birds include black swans and Pacific black ducks, Australasian grebe, Eurasian coots, Australasian swamphen, dusky moorhen and all four freshwater cormorant species. Feral mute swans were removed from the park between the 1980s and 1990s.  Feral common mynas and common starling are also numerous in the park.

Native mammals include common brushtail possums, common ringtail possums and water rat. Common bent-wing bat, white-striped free-tailed bat and Gould's wattled bat have also been recorded in the park.  Feral black rats are also common in the park. Foxes have also been spotted on occasion at night.

Several reptiles and amphibians, such as the marbled gecko and eastern long-necked turtle, make their home in the park.

The lake is home to some stocked freshwater fish species.  The Department of Primary Industries released native golden perch for recreational fishing purposes, and the Victorian Fisheries Authority (VFA) periodically introduces hatchery-raised rainbow trout as part of the Victoria State Government's $35 million "Go Fishing Victoria" initiative.  The European carp, deemed a noxious pest in Australia although easily the most popular freshwater game fish elsewhere in the Old World, are the most commonly found fish in the lake and is subject to control programs.

A vegetation survey in 1992 found 117 species of plants, a mixture of native and exotic species. A native revegetation area in the south east corner of the park features a large ancient river red gum known as the Corroboree Tree, a heritage registered eucalypt of cultural significance as a pre-European gathering place.

Facilities and features

There are nine separate picnic areas, most with barbecues, shelters and toilets. There is a vast network of sealed and unsealed, shared pedestrian/bicycle paths, centred on a main route that circles the lake. There are several playgrounds of varying sizes, the park also hosts many large sporting facilities, including:

Melbourne Sports & Aquatic Centre - International class swimming and sports facilities.
Lakeside Stadium - Home ground of Athletics Australia, Athletics Victoria and South Melbourne FC.
Albert Park Public Golf Course - including a golf driving range on the opposite side of the lake.
Junction Oval - historic sporting ground.
Several boating and sailing clubs - located on the north and eastern sides of the lake.
Several rowing clubs at either ends of the lake, specifically [2014] APSMRC [Albert Park South Melbourne], Caulfield Grammar School, Argonauts, YWCA, Korowa GS, Wesley College, Brighton Grammar School. Restaurants and Function Centres - including the Powerhouse, the Point and Carousel.Various sporting grounds/ovals - including Harry Trott Oval, Holdsworth Pavilion, Ross Gregory Oval, Stuart King Pavilion, Ian Johnson Oval, and several smaller bowls clubs, tennis clubs, cricket ovals, soccer and rugby fields located in the south western side of the park.

Other featuresGunn Island - an artificial island in the northern portion of the lake. A second island at the southern end was removed by the military as a training exercise in the early 1950s.The Aquatower''' - a large waterspout/fountain, which is currently turned off due to water restrictions.

Events

The Australian Grand Prix is held around the Albert Park Circuit around the lake. In 2020 and 2021 the event was cancelled due to the COVID-19 pandemic.

Every May the RSPCA holds the Million Paws Walk to raise needed income for their work with animals.

The Albert Sailing Club holds regular regattas on Saturdays. The Albert Park Yacht club, established in 1871 and the oldest continuing yacht club in Victoria, runs sailing classes over winter months on Albert Park lake and also has competitive sailing on Saturdays.

Albert Park is home to a 5 km parkrun event. Albert Melbourne parkrun starts at 8am every Saturday from the Coot Picnic area.

Albert Park is used a by a numbers of radio control model boat clubs throughout the year, except when access is unavailable due to the Grand Prix. This includes Task Force 72, Australia's only national model boat club.

Gallery

See also
 Parks and gardens of Melbourne
 Lakes and reservoirs of Melbourne

References

External links
 Albert Park - Parks Victoria
 Albert Sailing Club
 Albert Park Yacht Club
 Albert Park History
 Save Albert Park group

Lakes of Melbourne
Melbourne Water catchment
Rivers of Greater Melbourne (region)
Parks in Melbourne
1864 establishments in Australia
City of Port Phillip